Paula Adina Johnson (born 1959) is a cardiologist and the current president of Wellesley College. She is the first Black woman to serve in this role. The first Black graduate of Wellesley College came in the year 1887, and 129 years later President Johnson became the first Black leader. Prior to her role as president of Wellesley, Johnson founded and served as the inaugural executive director of the Mary Horrigan Connors Center for Women's Health & Gender Biology, as well as Chief of the Division of Women's Health at Brigham and Women's Hospital. Dr. Johnson's background in working for the betterment of women in the field of health led her on a notable path to Wellesley College, a women's college right outside of Boston, where there is an emphasis on the role of women in STEM.

Johnson was the Grace A. Young Family Professor of Medicine in the field of women's health, an endowed professorship named in honor of her mother, at Harvard Medical School.  She was also Professor of Epidemiology at the Harvard T.H. Chan School of Public Health.  She is a member of the National Academy of Medicine and has been featured as a national leader in medicine by the National Library of Medicine.

She was one of the first researchers in her field to identify the need for consideration of sex differences in medical treatment, and has been a significant voice in raising awareness of the importance of sex differences in understanding women's health. Her 2013 TED talk, "His and Her Healthcare," was named one of the "Top 10 TED Talks by Women to be Viewed by Everyone".

Personal life
Paula Johnson was born and raised in New York. She spoke to WGBH about her childhood: "I was very fortunate growing up in Brooklyn. I have one sister, and from a very early age my mother focused on us not only being well-educated, but also thinking independently.  I think that gave me the latitude to think differently about my college education. I went to Harvard Radcliffe, which allowed me to really have my first introduction to women's health." Separately, she said the best piece of advice her mom gave her was to "find your voice and not let failure knock you down." Additionally, Paula had always been passionate about science as well as helping others, making a career in medicine ideal. Johnson resides in Wellesley, Massachusetts with her family. She is married to Robert Sands, a rheumatologist at Atrius Health of Harvard University and has a son who attended Harvard, a teenage daughter, and two Havanese dogs.

Education 
Johnson's educational career began at Samuel J. Tilden High School in Brooklyn. She then attended Radcliffe College at Harvard University, where she majored in biology and graduated in 1980. Afterward, she attended Harvard Medical School. Developing an interest clinical epidemiology, she also studied at the Harvard School of Public Health. In 1985 she received her medical doctor's degree (M.D.) and a master's in public health (MPH) degrees from Harvard.

Medical career 
After graduating, Johnson began a residency in internal medicine and cardiovascular medicine at Brigham and Women's Hospital, where she decided to specialize in cardiology. In 1990, she became the first African American ever to hold the position of chief medical resident at the hospital.

Johnson worked in the hospital's cardiac transplant unit and served as director of Quality Management Services. As chief of the Division of Women's Health, she focused on women's access to cardiology care and the quality of that care. Johnson has also focused much of her work on educating and empowering African-American women, who are 50 percent more likely to die of cardiovascular disease than white women.

Johnson has been an important voice in making the case that men and women differ at the cellular level. Because of cellular differences, a number of diseases manifest differently in men and women. This has important implications for research, treatment, and patient care. Johnson was the lead author on "Sex-Specific Medical Research: Why Women’s Health Can’t Wait" (2014), from the Mary Horrigan Connors Center for Women’s Health & Gender Biology at Brigham and Women’s Hospital.

Traditionally, research studies and clinical trials of drugs and other treatments have tested men, not women. The lack of testing on women, combined with sex differences, has meant that women are much more likely to be negatively effected by side effects and differences in response to dosages when drugs are released to market.
The National Institutes of Health Revitalization Act of 1993 required that women and minorities  be represented in any research funded by the NIH. The resulting twenty years of research have supported the idea that significant sex differences occur in some diseases.

Johnson argues further that men and women should be tested in separate research trials. Combining data from men and women as if they were a single population may yield results that are applicable to neither sex. For example, research has resulted in recommendations that women take doses of the sleeping pill Ambien that are half the dosage recommended for men. As a result of the work of Johnson and others, the National Institutes of Health (NIH) issued new regulations in 2014, requiring that preclinical research address issues of sex and gender inclusion, to "ensure that the health of the United States is being served by supporting science that meets the highest standards of rigour."

Wellesley 

Paula Johnson began working at Wellesley College on July 1, 2016. In the 2020 fiscal year, Johnson was compensated $585,640 with an additional estimated bonus of $138,371 in her role as College President. Johnson is the third highest paid employee of Wellesley College.

Public Life 
During the COVID-19 Pandemic in 2020, Paula Johnson joined Massachusetts Governor Baker’s 14-member Higher Education Working Group (HEWG) to develop a framework to safely reopen campuses. In June, she also joined a WBUR digital town hall to analyze how COVID-19 revealed and exacerbated racial inequalities with U.S. Representative Ayanna Pressley and Dr. Mary Travis Bassett. In 2021, Johnson was nominated to the Governance and Nominating Committee, through the  board of directors at Abiomed. In 2023, Johnson was appointed to the Board of Directors at Johnson & Johnson.

References 

Presidents of Wellesley College
Radcliffe College alumni
Harvard Medical School alumni
Harvard School of Public Health alumni
African-American women academics
American women academics
African-American academics
Living people
1959 births
African-American women physicians
African-American physicians
21st-century African-American people
21st-century African-American women
20th-century African-American people
20th-century African-American women
Members of the National Academy of Medicine
Women heads of universities and colleges